Sasan Yafteh (born 11 November 1988), better known by his stage name, Sasy, formerly known as Sasy Mankan, is an Iranian pop & hip hop singer-songwriter from Ahvaz. Reuters has described him as one of Iran's most popular underground singers. Sasy's hit song "Gentleman" has over 100 million plays on the Persian music station Radio Javan.

Personal life
Sasy went to Kuala Lumpur, Malaysia and he lives in United States now.

Legal issues and controversies

Meeting Mehdi Karroubi
Before the 2009 Iranian presidential election Sasy met with the candidate Mehdi Karroubi. Due to his activity without permission, this singer was noticed and followed controversies by some media (especially some websites against Karroubi). Some websites wrote articles in Karroubi's critique under the heading "Aftershocks of meeting Sasy". In response to these controversies, Ahmad Zeidabadi stated that the reason for his vote for Karroubi was to meet with Sasy. Some sources also reported that Sasy performed live for Karroubi.

Arrests
Sasy was arrested on April 27, 2010, while attending several house parties in Kish. Some sources attributed his arrest to his support for Mehdi Karroubi in the presidential election, and some to "dance in the Kish Bazaar". In this regard, "Gouya News" published a satirical article entitled "Sasy Mankan behind Evin Showcase".

One week after Sasy's arrest, the deputy police chief, Ahmadreza Radan, said of Sasy's arrest: "The police will definitely include someone like this who is looking for so-called anomalies." However, in an interview with Rapfa, Sasy described his arrest as mere rumor.

Collaboration with Alexis Texas
In March 2021, the release of the music video for the song "Tehran Tokyo" by Sasy Mankan, starring porn star Alexis Texas, was met with much criticism. A group called his songs immoral for young audiences, and a fall into art and culture, the result of preventing real happiness in society and the lack of teaching Iranian music in schools. A group blamed the broadcaster's poor performance on music and its closed view.

Mohammad Sarshar, administrator of Children channel of Islamic republic of Iran broadcasting, also called for an international prosecution and the arrest of Sasy Mankan, according to the Convention on the Rights of the Child. He has previously been criticized by Iranian media for using sexually explicit language in his songs. Iranian singer Amir Tataloo found this "interesting and funny".

Discography

Albums
2014 Eshgh Na Mersi (EP)
2016 Bad Salighe
2018 Iranizeh

Singles
 2022 Maman Mano Bebakhsh
 2021 Tehran Tokyo (with Alexis Texas's presence)
2020 Doctor
 2019 Gentleman
 2018 Hali Hali
 2018 Che Pesari
 2018 Che Ajab
 2017 Hame Bada
 2017 Ostad
 2017 Noosh
 2016 Salam
 2016 Yekam Yekam (Ft Sahar)
 2016 Saaghiya
 2016 Masnuee (Ft Kourosh Moghimi)
 2015 Eshtebah
 2015 Halesh Khoobe
 2014 Vaghti Ba Hamdigeim
 2013 Vay Cheghad Mastam Man
 2012 Khat Roo Khat
 2010 IQ 2 ICU
 2010 Tehrano La(LA) Kon
 2008 Parmida (Ft Alishmas & Hossein Mokhte(Mokhtari))
 2008 Rap bandari
 2006-2007 Hichkas Diss Track (Ft Mokhte & Yelly & Pishtaz)

References

External links 
 
 
 
 Sasy on Spotify
 Laurent Dispot: Rappeurs sans peur iraniens underground (La Règle du Jeu) 

Living people
Iranian composers
Iranian rappers
Iranian songwriters
1988 births